Giancarlo Galdiolo (4 November 1948 – 8 September 2018) was an Italian professional football manager and player who played as a right back.

Playing career

Galdiolo played for Fiorentina between 1970 and 1980, winning the Coppa Italia title and an Anglo-Italian League Cup in 1975, collecting 229 league appearances and scoring 3 goals. He subsequently also spent two seasons with Sampdoria between 1980 and 1982. In total, he collected 223 Serie A appearances throughout his club career, and he retired from professional football in 1984, after two seasons with Forlì.

At international level, he represented the Italy under-23 side on two occasions in 1971.

Coaching career
After retiring, Galdiolo served as a coach with Forlì and Rimini.

Style of play
Galdiolo was a large, physically strong, tough, and hard-tackling yet fair man-marking right-back or centre-back (also known as "stopper", in Italian), with excellent stamina. Due to his correct behaviour, he was nicknamed "The Gentle Giant" throughout his career, as well as "Badile" ("Shovel", in Italian) – due to his physique –, and "Pappa", due to his resemblance to the Italian television star Peppino "Pappagone" De Filippo.

Personal life
Galdiolo was married to Maria Rosa; together, they had three children: Alessandro, Alberto e Eleonora.

Death
Galdiolo died on 8 September 2018 in his home in Castrocaro Terme e Terra del Sole, after a long illness. He had been suffering from a serious injury since 2010, a frontal temporal lobe dementia.

Honours

Club
Fiorentina
Coppa Italia: 1974–75
Anglo-Italian League Cup: 1975

Individual
Fiorentina Hall of Fame: 2018

References

1940s births
2018 deaths
Italian footballers
Calcio Padova players
ACF Fiorentina players
U.C. Sampdoria players
Bologna F.C. 1909 players
Serie A players
Association football fullbacks
Sportspeople from the Province of Padua
Footballers from Veneto